Dannevirke ( "work of the Danes", a reference to Danevirke;  or Tāmaki-nui-a-Rua, the area where the town is), is a rural service town in the Manawatū-Whanganui region of the North Island, New Zealand.  It is the major town of the administrative of the Tararua District, the easternmost of the districts of which the Horizons Regional Council has responsibilities.

History

Before European settlers arrived in the 1870s, the line of descent for Māori in the area was from the Kurahaupō waka. The tribe of the area is Rangitāne, with geographic distinction to Te Rangiwhakaewa in the immediate Dannevirke region. The first known 'Aotea' meeting house was established approximately 15 generations ago (from 2010) followed by the building of a marae at Makirikiri near Dannevirke at about the same time as the first Nordic settlers arrived from Napier and Hawkes Bay.

The town was founded on 15 October 1872 by Danish, Norwegian and Swedish settlers, adherents of Scandinavism, who arrived at the port of Napier and moved inland. The settlers, who arrived under the Public Works Act, built their initial settlement in a clearing of the Seventy Mile Bush.

The Dannevirke after which the town was named is an extensive Viking Age fortification line in Denmark which had a strong emotive symbolic role for 19th-century Danes, especially after the site had fallen into German hands in the German-Danish War of 1864 – a recent and very painful event for these settlers. The settlement quickly earned the nickname of "sleeper town", as the town's purpose was to provide tōtara sleepers for the Napier–Wellington railway line. At one stage the area had 50 operating sawmills. After the native bush was cleared, the land was turned into pasture for grazing animals.

On 27 October 1917, much of the town's business district was destroyed by fire. The fire had started in the Andrew's Hotel on the corner of High and Station Streets at about 2pm. Flames blew across the road engulfing the Dannevirke Co-operative Association's store. As the fire spread through adjoining shops another hotel, the Masonic was engulfed. By about 5pm the Dannevirke and Woodville Fire Brigades, along with assistance from the local community had brought the fires under control. In total 27 business premises and 2 hotels were destroyed with damage estimated at £200,000.

Demographics

It had a population of 5,508 at the 2018 New Zealand census, an increase of 429 people (8.4%) since the 2013 census, and a decrease of 51 people (-0.9%) since the 2006 census. There were 2,178 households. There were 2,613 males and 2,892 females, giving a sex ratio of 0.9 males per female, with 1,137 people (20.6%) aged under 15 years, 978 (17.8%) aged 15 to 29, 2,166 (39.3%) aged 30 to 64, and 1,233 (22.4%) aged 65 or older.

Ethnicities were 75.2% New Zealand European/Pākehā, 33.1% Māori, 2.3% Pacific peoples, 3.9% Asian, and 1.0% other ethnicities (totals add to more than 100% since people could identify with multiple ethnicities).

The proportion of people born overseas was 8.5%, compared with 27.1% nationally.

Although some people objected to giving their religion, 46.8% had no religion, 37.1% were Christian, 0.4% were Hindu, 0.6% were Muslim, 0.4% were Buddhist and 7.1% had other religions.

Of those at least 15 years old, 330 (7.5%) people had a bachelor or higher degree, and 1,380 (31.6%) people had no formal qualifications. The employment status of those at least 15 was that 1,743 (39.9%) people were employed full-time, 666 (15.2%) were part-time, and 204 (4.7%) were unemployed.

Papatawa statistical area

It had a population of 1,302 at the 2018 New Zealand census, a decrease of 24 people (-1.8%) since the 2013 census, and an increase of 9 people (0.7%) since the 2006 census. There were 486 households. There were 669 males and 633 females, giving a sex ratio of 1.06 males per female. The median age was 43.8 years (compared with 37.4 years nationally), with 279 people (21.4%) aged under 15 years, 183 (14.1%) aged 15 to 29, 624 (47.9%) aged 30 to 64, and 222 (17.1%) aged 65 or older.

Ethnicities were 85.9% New Zealand European/Pākehā, 22.6% Māori, 0.9% Pacific peoples, 2.1% Asian, and 0.9% other ethnicities (totals add to more than 100% since people could identify with multiple ethnicities).

The proportion of people born overseas was 8.8%, compared with 27.1% nationally.

Although some people objected to giving their religion, 45.6% had no religion, 44.0% were Christian, 0.2% were Hindu, 0.2% were Buddhist and 3.9% had other religions.

Of those at least 15 years old, 117 (11.4%) people had a bachelor or higher degree, and 255 (24.9%) people had no formal qualifications. The median income was $36,600, compared with $31,800 nationally. The employment status of those at least 15 was that 573 (56.0%) people were employed full-time, 168 (16.4%) were part-time, and 18 (1.8%) were unemployed.

Culture

Dannevirke has three marae (tribal meeting grounds) of the Rangitāne tribe and its hapū (sub-tribes); each marae has a wharenui (meeting house). Kaitoki Mare is affiliated with the Ngāti Pakapaka and Ngāti Te Rangiwhakaewa hapū, and includes the Kaitoki Memorial Hall. Mākirikiri is affiliated with Ngāti Mutuahi and Ngāti Te Rangiwhakaewa hapū, and includes the Aotea Tuatoru wharenui. Whiti te Rā marae, also known as Poherau marae and is of Ngati Kahungunu iwi, is affiliated with Ngāti Ihaka Rautahi te hapu, and includes Whiti te Rā wharenui.

Totara College hosts the Dannevirke Garden and Craft Expo, an annual event that has grown to a considerable size.

Sport
Dannevirke has produced a number of sports men and women in a number of different disciplines, among them rugby player John Timu, who made New Zealand teams in both union and league. Ewen Chatfield, who was an important member of the successful New Zealand cricket team of the 1980s Hadlee-Coney-Crowe era, is from Dannevirke, as is former All Black Duncan Hales, who now resides in the United States.

Other Dannevirke All Blacks were Colin Loader (1950s), Blair Furlong (1970 to South Africa), Lui Paewai who is widely acknowledged as the youngest All Black in history at just 17 years old (1924 Invincibles) and whose brother, nephews and grand-nephews (Doc, Hepa, Nathan and Murdoch respectively) went on to have good careers for Hawkes Bay and the New Zealand Maori side, and Roy White (post-war All Black in 1946 and 1947).  Other All Blacks who spent time in Dannevirke included 1981 All Black tourist to Romania and France Wayne Neville, who attended Dannevirke High School, and John Ashworth, who moved from Canterbury to a farm near Dannevirke late in his career.

The Dannevirke Sports Club and Aotea Sports Club are the major outlets for sport in the town with netball, cricket and soccer teams as well as a rugby team that compete in the Premier Manawatu Senior Competition and the Hawke's Bay 1st Division.

Climate
Dannevirke has an Oceanic climate, (Köppen:Cfb). Due its high altitude the summer temperatures are often cooler compared to other Eastern North Island towns, such as Masterton, Napier and Gisborne, while in winter Dannevirke can regularly experience frosts as in other parts of New Zealand. Snow is rare, the latest snow to hit Dannevirke was 15 August 2011.

Schools

Notable residents
 Sir William Ian Axford - Space Scientist
Bob Bell - Farmer at Ākitio (Marainanga Station), Owner of the Ruahine Club, and Ruahine Lodge (Dannevike), and campaigner of the famous Condor Yachting campaigns of the 1970s and 1980s.
 Sir Joh Bjelke-Petersen - Australian politician and Premier of Queensland
 Victor Bleasdale - Brigadier General, US Marine Corps, awarded Navy Cross twice for heroism in World War 1
 Rangi Chase - Rugby league player, capped for England
 Ewen Chatfield - New Zealand test cricketer
 Peter Connell - Irish cricketer
 Peter Cullinane - Catholic Bishop of the Diocese of Palmerston North
 Lauris Edmond - New Zealand poet
 Blair Furlong - New Zealand international rugby player
 Bryan Gould - Rhodes Scholar, Deputy Leader of the British Labour Party, Dux of Dannevirke High School.
 Duncan Hales - New Zealand international rugby player
 Aaron Hape - Fellow of the Royal Society of Arts
 Weller Hauraki - Rugby league player
 Jack Kerr - New Zealand test cricketer
 Charlotte Kight - Of Ākitio b. Dannevirke, Silver Fern Netballer.
 Phil Lamason - World War II pilot
 Megan Larsen - organic skincare entrepreneur
 Colin Loader - New Zealand international rugby player
 Sue McCauley - Playwright, author of 'Other Halves'
 Robin Maconie – composer, pianist, and writer
 Clint Newland - Rugby union player
 W. H. Oliver - historian and poet
 Lui Paewai - New Zealand international rugby player, youngest All Black ever
 Murray Parker - New Zealand test and one-day cricketer
 Bill Phillips - New Zealand and Australian economist, creator of the Phillips curve
 Sir Alfred Ransom (1868–1943), Mayor of Dannevirke (1910–1919) and Member of Parliament (1922–1943)
 Hans Madsen Ries (1860–1926), Mayor of Dannevirke (1903–1905, 1906–1910)
 Luke Ronchi - Dual international (Australia and New Zealand) T20, one-day and test cricketer
 Katrina Shanks - Politician, Member of Parliament
 John Timu - Dual rugby and rugby league international
 Joe Ward - Rugby union player
 Sonny Wool - Psychic sheep of the 2011 Rugby World Cup (b. Dannevirke)

References

External links

 Tararua District Council
 Local page of GenWeb
 - List of Dannevirke All Blacks

 
Populated places in Manawatū-Whanganui
Tararua District
Populated places on the Manawatū River